Vitex cymosa is a species of tree in the family Lamiaceae. It is native to Panama and South America.

References 

cymosa
Trees of Panama
Trees of Peru
Trees of Argentina
Trees of Ecuador
Trees of Colombia
Trees of Paraguay
Trees of Bolivia
Trees of Brazil
Trees of Venezuela